Carabus taedatus is a species of ground beetle in the family Carabidae. It is found in North America.

Subspecies
These four subspecies belong to the species Carabus taedatus:
 Carabus taedatus agassii LeConte, 1850
 Carabus taedatus bicanaliceps Casey, 1920
 Carabus taedatus rainieri Van Dyke, 1945
 Carabus taedatus taedatus Fabricius, 1787

References

Further reading

 

taedatus
Articles created by Qbugbot
Beetles described in 1787